Deeson is an unincorporated community located in Bolivar County, Mississippi, United States along Mississippi Highway 1.

Deeson's population was 110 in 1900.  It was noted in 1907 that Deeson had a money order post office, and a large cotton seed oil mill. A post office operated under the name Deeson from 1896 to 1959.

References

Unincorporated communities in Bolivar County, Mississippi
Unincorporated communities in Mississippi